Class T: Technology is a classification used by the Library of Congress Classification system. This page outlines the subclasses of Class T.

T - Technology (general) 

10.5-11.9...................................Communication of technical information
11.95-12.5.................................Industrial directories
55-55.3............................................Industrial safety. Industrial accident prevention
55.4-60.8...................................Industrial engineering. Management engineering
57-57.97..........................................Applied mathematics. Quantitative methods
57.6-57.97.............................................Operations research. Systems analysis
58.4................................................Managerial control systems
58.5-58.64.......................................Information technology
58.6-58.62.......................................Management information systems
58.7-58.8.........................................Production capacity. Manufacturing capacity
59-59.2............................................Standardization
59.5................................................Automation
59.7-59.77.......................................Human engineering in industry. Man-machine systems
60-60.8............................................Work measurement. Methods engineering
61-173.......................................Technical Education. Technical schools
173.2-174.5...............................Technological change
175-178.....................................Industrial research. Research and development
201-342.....................................Patents. Trademarks
351-385.....................................Mechanical drawing. Engineering graphics
391-995.....................................Exhibitions. Trade shows. World's fairs

TA - Engineering (general). Civil engineering 

164..........................................Bioengineering
165..........................................Engineering instruments, meters, etc. Industrial instrumentation
166-167...................................Human engineering
168..........................................Systems engineering
170-171...................................Environmental engineering
174..........................................Engineering design
177.4-185................................Engineering economy
190-194...................................Management of engineering works
197-198...................................Engineering meteorology
213-215...................................Engineering machinery, tools, and implements
329-348...................................Engineering mathematics. Engineering analysis
349-359...................................Mechanics of engineering. Applied mechanics
365-367...................................Acoustics in engineering. Acoustical engineering
401-492...................................Materials of engineering and construction. Mechanics of materials
495..........................................Disasters and engineering
501-625...................................Surveying
630-695...................................Structural engineering (General)
703-712...................................Engineering geology. Rock mechanics. Soil mechanics. Underground construction
715-787...................................Earthwork. Foundations
800-820...................................Tunneling. Tunnels
1001-1280...............................Transportation engineering
1501-1820...............................Applied optics. Photonics
2001-2040...............................Plasma engineering. Applied plasma dynamics

TC - Hydraulic engineering. Ocean engineering 

1-978.................................Hydraulic engineering
160-181...................................Technical hydraulics
183-201...................................General preliminary operations. Dredging. Submarine building
203-380...................................Harbors and coast protective works. Coastal engineering. Lighthouses
401-506...................................River, lake, and water-supply engineering (General)
530-537...................................River protective works. Regulation. Flood control
540-558...................................Dams. Barrages
601-791...................................Canals and inland navigation. Waterways
801-978...................................Irrigation engineering. Reclamation of wasteland. Drainage
1501-1800.........................Ocean engineering

TD - Environmental technology. Sanitary engineering 

159-168...................................Municipal engineering
169-171.8................................Environmental protection
172-193.5................................Environmental pollution
194-195...................................Environmental effects of industries and plants
201-500...................................Water supply for domestic and industrial purposes
419-428.........................................Water pollution
429.5-480.7..................................Water purification. Water treatment and conditioning. Saline water conversion
481-493.........................................Water distribution systems
511-780...................................Sewage collection and disposal systems. Sewerage
783-812.5................................Municipal refuse. Solid wastes
813-870...................................Street cleaning. Litter and its removal
878-894...................................Special types of environment. Including soil pollution, air pollution, noise pollution
895-899...................................Industrial and factory sanitation
896-899.........................................Industrial and factory wastes
920-934...................................Rural and farm sanitary engineering
940-949...................................Low temperature sanitary engineering
1020-1066...............................Hazardous substances and their disposal

TE - Highway engineering. Roads and pavements 

175-176.5................................Highway design. Interchanges and intersections
177-178.8................................Roadside development. Landscaping
200-205...................................Materials for roadmaking
206-209.5................................Location engineering
210-228.3................................Construction details. Including foundations, maintenance, equipment
250-278.8................................Pavements and paved roads
279..........................................Streets
279.5-298................................Pedestrian facilities
280-295.........................................Sidewalks. Footpaths. Flagging
298................................................Curbs. Curbstones

TF - Railroad engineering and operation 

200-320...................................Railway construction
340-499...................................Railway equipment and supplies
501-668...................................Railway operation and management
670-851...................................Local and light railways
840-851.........................................Elevated railways and subways
855-1127.................................Electric railways
1300-1620................................High speed ground transportation

TG - Bridge engineering 

1-470................................Bridge engineering

TH - Building construction 

845-895...................................Architectural engineering. Structural engineering of buildings
900-915...................................Construction equipment in building
1000-1725...............................Systems of building construction. Including fireproof construction, concrete construction
2025-3000...............................Details in building design and construction. Including walls, roofs
3301-3411...............................Maintenance and repair
4021-4977...............................Buildings: Construction with reference to use. Including public buildings, dwellings
5011-5701...............................Construction by phase of the work (Building trades)
6014-6081...............................Environmental engineering of buildings. Sanitary engineering of buildings
6101-6887...............................Plumbing and pipefitting
7005-7699...............................Heating and ventilation. Air conditioning
7700-7975...............................Illumination. Lighting
8001-8581...............................Decoration and decorative furnishings
9025-9745...............................Protection of buildings. Including protection from dampness, fire, burglary

TJ - Mechanical engineering and machinery 

163.13-163.25..........................Power resources
163.26-163.5............................Energy conservation
170-179...................................Mechanics applied to machinery. Dynamics
181-210...................................Mechanical movements
210.2-211.47............................Mechanical devices and figures. Automata. Ingenious mechanisms. Robots (General)
212-225...................................Control engineering systems. Automatic machinery (General)
227-240...................................Machine design and drawing
241-254.7................................Machine construction (General)
255-265...................................Heat engines
266-267.5................................Turbines. Turbomachines (General)
268-740...................................Steam engineering
603-695.........................................Locomotives
751-805...................................Miscellaneous motors and engines. Including gas, gasoline, diesel engines
807-830...................................Renewable energy sources
836-927...................................Hydraulic machinery
940-940.5................................Vacuum technology
950-1030..................................Pneumatic machinery
1040-1119................................Machinery exclusive of prime movers
1125-1345................................Machine shops and machine shop practice
1350-1418................................Hoisting and conveying machinery
1425-1475................................Lifting and pressing machinery
1480-1496................................Agricultural machinery. Farm machinery
1501-1519................................Sewing machines

TK - Electrical engineering. Electronics. Nuclear engineering 

301-399...................................Electric meters
452-454.4................................Electric apparatus and materials. Electric circuits. Electric networks
1001-1841...............................Production of electric energy or power. Powerplants. Central stations
2000-2891...............................Dynamoelectric machinery and auxiliaries. Including generators, motors, transformers
2896-2985...............................Production of electricity by direct energy conversion
3001-3521...............................Distribution or transmission of electric power
4001-4102...............................Applications of electric power
4125-4399...............................Electric lighting
4601-4661...............................Electric heating
5101-6720...............................Telecommunication. Including telegraphy, telephone, radio, radar, television
7800-8360...............................Electronics
7885-7895.....................................Computer engineering. Computer hardware
8300-8360.....................................Photoelectronic devices (General)
9001-9401...............................Nuclear engineering. Atomic power
9900-9971...............................Electricity for amateurs. Amateur constructors' manuals

TL - Motor vehicles. Aeronautics. Astronautics 

1-484.......................................Motor vehicles. Cycles
500-777...................................Aeronautics. Aeronautical engineering
780-785.8................................Rocket propulsion. Rockets
787-4050.................................Astronautics. Space travel

TN - Mining engineering. Metallurgy 

263-271...................................Mineral deposits. Metallic ore deposits. Prospecting
275-325...................................Practical mining operations. Safety measures
331-347...................................Mine transportation, haulage and hoisting. Mining machinery
400-580...................................Ore deposits and mining of particular metals
600-799...................................Metallurgy
799.5-948................................Nonmetallic minerals
950-997...................................Building and ornamental stones

TP - Chemical technology 

155-156...................................Chemical engineering
200-248...................................Chemicals: Manufacture, use, etc.
248.13-248.65.........................Biotechnology
250-261...................................Industrial electrochemistry
267.5-301................................Explosives and pyrotechnics
315-360...................................Fuel
368-456...................................Food processing and manufacture
480-498...................................Low temperature engineering. Cryogenic engineering. Refrigeration
500-660...................................Fermentation industries. Beverages. Alcohol
670-699...................................Oils, fats, and waxes
690-692.5......................................Petroleum refining. Petroleum products
700-746...................................Illuminating industries (Nonelectric)
751-762...................................Gas industry
785-869...................................Clay industries. Ceramics. Glass
875-888...................................Cement industries
890-933...................................Textile bleaching, dyeing, printing, etc.
934-945...................................Paints, pigments, varnishes, etc.
1080-1185...............................Polymers and polymer manufacture

TR - Photography 

250-265...................................Cameras
287-500...................................Photographic processing. Darkroom technique
504-508...................................Transparencies. Diapositives
510-545...................................Color photography
550-581...................................Studio and laboratory
590-620...................................Lighting
624-835...................................Applied photography. Including artistic, commercial, medical photography, photocopying processes
845-899...................................Cinematography. Motion pictures
925-1050.................................Photomechanical processes

TS - Manufactures 

155-194...................................Production management. Operations management
195-198.8................................Packaging
200-770...................................Metal manufactures. Metalworking
780-788...................................Stonework
800-937...................................Wood technology. Lumber
840-915.........................................Wood products. Furniture
920-937.........................................Chemical processing of wood
940-1047..................................Leather industries. Tanning
1060-1070................................Furs
1080-1268................................Paper manufacture and trade
1300-1865................................Textile industries
1870-1935................................Rubber industry
1950-1982................................Animal products
2120-2159................................Cereals and grain. Milling industry
2220-2283................................Tobacco industry
2284-2288................................Animal feeds and feed mills. Pet food industry

TT - Handicrafts. Arts and crafts 

161-170.7................................Manual training. School shops
174-176...................................Articles for children
180-200...................................Woodworking. Furniture making. Upholstering
201-203...................................Lathework. Turning
205-267...................................Metalworking
300-382.8................................Painting. Wood finishing
387-410...................................Soft home furnishings
490-695...................................Clothing manufacture. Dressmaking. Tailoring
697-927...................................Home arts. Homecrafts. Including sewing, embroidery, decorative crafts
950-979...................................Hairdressing. Beauty culture. Barbers' work
980-999...................................Laundry work

TX - Home economics 

301-339...................................The house. Including arrangement, care, servants
341-641...................................Nutrition. Foods and food supply
642-840...................................Cooking
851-885...................................Dining-room service
901-946.5................................Hospitality industry. Hotels, clubs, restaurants, etc. Food service
950-953...................................Taverns, barrooms, saloons
955-985...................................Building operation and housekeeping
1100-1105...............................Mobile home living
1110........................................Recreational vehicle living

References

Further reading 
 Full schedule of all LCC Classifications
 List of all LCC Classification Outlines

T